The 1998 Colorado gubernatorial election was held on November 3, 1998 to select the governor of the state of Colorado. Under newly applicable term limits, incumbent Governor Roy Romer, a Democrat, was unable to seek re-election. Lieutenant Governor Gail Schoettler, ran to succeed Romer, and won the Democratic primary; her running mate, Bernie Buescher, won the lieutenant-gubernatorial primary unopposed. In the Republican primary, Bill Owens, the State Treasurer, and his eventual running mate, Joe Rogers, won their respective primaries by wide margins. 

In the general election, Owens narrowly defeated Schoettler, aided by a strong performance by Republican U.S. Senator Ben Nighthorse Campbell in his re-election campaign. Owens's narrow election meant that he was the first Republican Governor in 24 years, and Rogers's election made him the second Black Lieutenant Governor in the state's history, after George L. Brown, who was elected in 1974. This was also the last election in which Colorado held separate primary elections for governor and lieutenant governor; following a statutory change in 2000, gubernatorial candidates selected their running mates prior to the primary.

Democratic Primary

Governor

Candidates
 Gail Schoettler, Lieutenant Governor of Colorado
 Mike Feeley, Minority Leader of the Colorado State Senate

Results

Lieutenant Governor

Candidates
 Bernie Buescher, former Executive Director of the Colorado Department of Health Care Policy and Financing

Results

Republican Primary

Governor

Candidates
Bill Owens, Colorado State Treasurer
Tom Norton, President of the Colorado State Senate

Results

Lieutenant Governor

Candidates
 Joe Rogers, former Chief Counsel to U.S. Senator Hank Brown, 1996 Republican nominee for Colorado's 1st congressional district
 Jim Congrove, State Senator

Results

General election

References

External links 
 1998 CO governor election results at cnn.com

Gubernatorial
1998
1998 United States gubernatorial elections